WWSE (93.3 FM) is a commercial radio station licensed to Jamestown, New York.  It is owned by the Media One Radio Group.  WWSE has an effective radiated power (ERP) of 26,500 watts.

Programming
The station broadcasts a hot adult contemporary radio format, featuring hits from the 1990s through today.  Local personalities heard on the station include Lee John, the longest running FM Morning Show in the region (beginning on April 1, 2001) and Andrew Hill, who has been with the station since 2000.  Syndicated personalities John Tesh and Mario Lopez are heard each weekday.  Weekend programming includes the iHeartRadio Countdown, Roula, RetroMix, RetroPop Reunion and Nina Blackwood's Absolutely 80's.  Weather forecasts are provided by WGRZ.

WWSE is also a longtime affiliate of Buffalo Bills Radio Network, broadcasting all the team's NFL games during the season.

History
In , the station first signed on the air.  It was the FM counterpart to sister station WJTN 1240 AM.  It originally simulcast most of WJTN's programming.  In the late 1970s, it began broadcasting its own separate contemporary hits format.

The station hosted the popular Chautauqua Lake Idol for 11 years in Bemus Point, attracting thousands of spectators to The Floating Stage on Monday night's during the summer.

References

External links

 FCC History Cards For WWSE (FM) (1948-1980)

Jamestown, New York
WSE
Hot adult contemporary radio stations in the United States
Radio stations established in 1947
1947 establishments in New York (state)